Corynebacterium renale is a pathogenic bacterium that causes cystitis and pyelonephritis in cattle.

C. renale is a facultatively anaerobic  Gram-positive organism, characterized by nonencapsulated, nonsporulated, immobile, straight or curved rods with a length of 1 to 8 µm and width of 0.3 to 0.8 µm, which forms ramified aggregations in culture (looking like "Chinese characters"). 

The bacterium is sensitive to the majority of antibiotics, such as penicillins, ampicillin, cephalosporins, quinolones, chloramphenicol, tetracyclines, cefuroxime, and trimethoprim.

Due to similarities in diagnostic testing procedures Corynebacterium cystiditis may be misdiagnosed as Corynebacterium renale in beef cattle.

References

Further reading 
 
  Smith, JS, Krull, AC, Schleining, JA, Derscheid, RJ, Kreuder, AJ. Clinical presentations and antimicrobial susceptibilities of Corynebacterium cystitidis associated with renal disease in four beef cattle. J Vet Intern Med. 2020; 34: 2169– 2174. https://doi.org/10.1111/jvim.15844

External links
 Type strain of Corynebacterium renale at BacDive -  the Bacterial Diversity Metadatabase

Corynebacterium
Gram-positive bacteria
Bacteria described in 1906
Animal bacterial diseases
Bovine diseases